Charles Brenton Fisk (February 7, 1925 – December 16, 1983) was an organ builder and a physicist who was one of the first to use mechanical tracker actions instead of electro-pneumatic actions in modern organ construction. Prior to his career in organ building, Fisk was involved in the Manhattan Project during World War II, after which he changed his career from atomic physics to organ building. He was the co-founder of C.B. Fisk, Inc., which is a firm that has built many respected organs worldwide. He was born in Washington, D.C. and grew up in Massachusetts.

Life and career 
On February 7, 1925, Fisk was born in Washington, DC, United States. His father, Brenton Kern Fisk, worked as a lawyer, while his mother, Amelia Worthington Fisk, worked as a social worker and advocated for women's suffrage. In the early 1930s, Fisk and his family relocated to the city of Cambridge, which is a city in Massachusetts. It was there that Fisk joined the choir of Christ Church at Cambridge Common as a soprano. He sang under E. Power Biggs, who was the choirmaster and organist, though Fisk later said that he barely recalls the experience. Alongside choir, his musical ability also included playing trumpets and organs. 

When Fisk was 13 years old, Fisk was gifted a reed organ and was able to carry out minor repairs. One of Fisk's friends recalled that he fiddled with electromechanical devices, with him building his own amplifiers when he was 14 years old. He later said that organ music was his favorite to play on the amplifiers because it "showed the amplifier off". Specifically, he was well-versed in creating tube amplifiers, with friends of Fisk's parent requesting an amplifier from him.

Education and military draft 

He studied at The Cambridge School of Weston from 1938 to 1942, graduating from the school.
In 1943, Fisk secured a job in the University of Chicago's Metallurgical Laboratory with the aid of his physicist uncle, Joyce Stearns, who also worked there. Stearns suggested to Fisk's parents that Fisk should work with him in the laboratory. At the time, Fisk was 17 years old and eligible to be drafted for military service. The Georgia Review asserts that Stearns' motives for making this suggestion were to help Fisk avoid being drafted into military service.

Soon after graduating high school, he was drafted into the World War II. As part of the draft, He was transferred to the Los Alamos National Laboratory in July 1944. Fisk later recounted that his director in the Metallurgical Laboratory sent him to Los Alamos because he was enlisted to the army.

While at Los Alamos, Fisk was assigned as an electronics technician and a lab helper in the Bomb Physics Division. he worked under Darol Froman with 20 other people. He was a member of the 9812th Special Engineer Detachment, which was a unit that collected knowledgeable people into research. His job included soldering pre-amps, which is a component for the electronic sensors. These sensors were used to measure  how well the detonator imploded in a perfect sphere during explosive testing. In other words, he worked as a part of the Manhattan Project, helping to create the famous atomic bombs. However, he was not aware of it until weeks before the bomb was launched.

After World War ll ended, Fisk studied at Harvard University for a physics major. Continuing his interest in music, at the Memorial Church of Harvard University, he joined the choir and the Harvard Glee Club. He successfully graduated from Harvard with a physics undergraduate degree in 1949.

After graduating, Fisk wished to stay in New Mexico, and was offered a position as an assistant in Los Alamos. However, he was unable due to his father's deteriorating health and the desire to stay with Ann Lindenmuth, a person who would be Fisk's future spouse. Turning down the offer, Fisk researched at Brookhaven National Laboratory, studying cosmic rays for one and a half years. In 1950 to 1951, he left for California to complete his education in physics. There, he attended Stanford University for a physics PhD. At Stanford, Fisk studied organs with the American organist Herbert Nanney and he became an apprentice of the organ builder John Swinford. He left Stanford's physics curriculum after finishing only one semester or six-weeks of studies, and ended up switching to a music corriculum. The Boston Globe and The Diapason attributed this to the unease he felt for contributing to the bombings of Hiroshima and Nagasaki. However, an opinion essay from The Georgia Review, argues that citing his career change on entirely on moral grounds is a drastic oversimplification at best. In a letter Fisk sent to his parents on August 12, 1945, he wrote:

and that

In October 1950, Fisk wrote to his parents that he was switching careers to music. Fisk continued his apprenticeship and part-time job under John Swinford in Redwood City, California. At the same time, he studied under the professors Putnam Aldrich and George Houle. One of the first time Fisk worked on an organ was when he helped Swinford build the organ for Trinity Episcopal Church.  After John's urging, Fisk became an apprentice of Walter Holtkamp at Cleveland, Ohio in 1954 after Holtkamp offered him a position in 1952. He learned various aspects of shop technique under Holtkamp, a gap his apprenticeship with Swinford had. He dropped out of his music degree to focus on organ building.

In a later interview by Keith Yocum when Fisk was 54 years old, Fisk had commented:

An essay published in The Georgia Review expressed an opinion that Fisk, in his later years, seemed to place more importance on his musical instrument than on the value of human lives based on this quote.

C.B. Fisk, Inc.

In 1955, Fisk returned to New England. Then, he became a partner of the Andover Organ Company in Methuen, Massachusetts. For context, Andover Organ Company was founded in 1948 by Thomas W. Byers, with Fisk becoming a partner some years later. Like Fisk, Byers was an organ builder that preferred manual organs over electric ones. In 1958, Fisk became the full owner after Byers left the company. In 1960, Fisk changed the firm's name to represent the new ownership: C.B. Fisk, Inc. It was started in a more spacious recycled factory in Gloucester, Massachusetts in 1961. This had employees move from Methuen to Gloucester to keep their jobs. So, some employees stayed and built a new firm with the former namesake, Andover Organ Company.

Notable organists Barbara Owen, Fritz Noack, and John Brombaugh were all once employed by C.B. Fisk, Inc. In addition, A. David Moore, Jeremy Adams, and the supervisor of the workshop, David Waddell, were all part of the staff. Some have moved on from the Fisk's company and created their own organ-building companies, with Noack establishing the Noack Organ Company and Brombaugh establishing the John Brombaugh & Associates.

Later, Fisk's firm relocated to Gloucester due to the expanded business and the fire hazard the previous location provided. The firm continues to operate in that location. After Fisk's death, C. B. Fisk, Inc. continues to manufactures organs to the present day, with it becoming an employee-owned company.

Personal life and death 
Fisk's first marriage was with Ann Warren Lindenmuth, having a son and a daughter. In his second marriage, he married Virginia Lee Crist of Gloucester. The marriage was held at Rockport, Mass. He had two stepdaughters and a stepson from his second marriage.

Fisk died on December 16, 1983, aged 58 years, due to a liver autoimmune condition at Philips House, Massachusetts General Hospital. More specifically, he had a condition named sclerosing cholangitis for nearly 3 decades but it was not until the years leading up to his death that it was diagnosed. Fisk's funeral was held on December 20, 1983, at St. John's Episcopal Church, Gloucester. Following on January 21, 1984, a memorial service for Fisk was held in the Memorial Church of Harvard University.

Membership 
During his life, Fisk was a member in the American Pipe Organ Association, the International Society of Organ Builders, the American Institute of Organ Builders, the Organ Historical Society, and the American Guild of Organists.

Fisk Organs

Organ building style 

In contrast with the tracker-action organs of the baroque period, the common practice in early 20th-century organ building was using an electro-pneumatic action mechanism. However, Fisk was one of the first to break this norm; he adopted the tracker-action and stop-action mechanisms of historical European and American organs, making him one of the first modern American organ builders to do so. This is a part of a larger movement called Organ Reform Movement, which Fisk was cited as a major participant of by American Organist Magazine.

In tracker-action organs, the movement of the keys or pedals is linked mechanically to the valve, enabling air to flow through the organ pipes. Conversely, electro-pneumatic action organs have the valves and keys connected through electricity, without the use of mechanical trackers. In an organ, a manual is a set of keys that are played with the hands, similar to the keyboard on a piano. However, unlike a piano, an organ can have multiple manuals, which are layered on top of each other.

Jonathan Ambrosino, an organ historian, wrote that although he took inspiration from older works, he added his own personal touches to the organ in contrast to what he analyzed as then-standard methodology of replicating historical organs exactly.

To further his understanding of traditional organs, Fisk studied features of historical European organs. He then tried to emulate them in his organs. During his entire career, he often made  trips to European countries, with the first one being in 1959, where he traveled with Arthur Howes. The organ located in Jakobikirche church was of particular interest to Fisk, in which he made three journeys to Germany and studied the organ.

In addition to organ building, Fisk restored various historical organs during his life. Barbara Owens, a former collaborator of Fisk, wrote that his works were influenced by German and French organs, though he derived from many other sources as well. His organs was described to be of an eclectic nature, never sticking to only one style of organ building.

Opus numbers 
Fisk numbered his organ works with opus numbers. However there exists several peculiarities in this system. Some opuses were never built due to cancellations. Some were merely additions and restorations of former organs. Opus numbers 1 through 24 are not actually built by Fisk. This was because he continued the preexisting opus numbers of the Andover Organ Company, meaning it was built by Byers.

Opus 24 through 27 was built when Byers and Fisk co-owned the Andover organ company and opus 28 through 35 was built before the rebranding to C. B. Fisk, Inc. Opus 35 through 85 was built by C. B. Fisk, Inc. when Fisk was still alive, and rest was built after his death.

Organ building philosophy 
Jones Boyds, an organist in Stetson University, writes that Fisk had mixed views on organ being used along with orchestra, basing it on this quote from Fisk: "[T]he fortunes of the organ and of the orchestra are to an extent mutually exclusive and my personal view is that the one instrument takes the place of the other [...] There is a human craving, musically speaking, for a towering musical effect. The organ satisfied this craving for hundreds of years before the 19th century orchestra took it over". Despite this, concert hall organs was a topic of study of Fisk's beginning from 1976.

In 1968, The Diapason published an article written by Fisk called "The Organ's Breath of Life" in which he argued in favor of using historical organ wind systems. It was faced with opposition when it was first released. In his essay, he wrote that organs should return the "warbling" sound of hand-cranked wind supply with mechanical changes to the electrical wind supply. This idea was negatively received in its publication but now is an industry standard.In September 1987, Fisk wrote an article named "Some Thoughts on Pipe Metal" in which he described the differences between the tonal qualities of metals used in pipes. He described lead pipes as “a darkness, a hollowness, a sound as of deepest antiquity [and] a strength of sound.” and that tin pipes embodied "sound of refinement”. It was published by The American Organist and was cited by organists Jonathan M. Gregoire and Hans Davidsson.

Noted Fisk Organs 

In 1958, the Rice university hired the Andover Company to build an organ (op. 25). This was Fisk's first organ that he made completely from scratch as all of his past works were repairs and additions onto previous organs. In fact, it can be considered Fisk's first opus. It is also the last electric organ he made as all of his later organs used tracker actions. Rückpositiv is a smaller section of organ pipes that can be played separate from the larger main pipes. Though Rückpositiv can be easily seen in old organs, they were essentially extinct in the 1960s when the organ was built. It is also known as Andover-Fisk Organ.

His first significant work was constructed in 1961: a two-manual fully mechanical-action organ (op. 35). It was built in Mount Calvary Episcopal Church, Baltimore, with the help of organ builder Dirk Flentrop. Flentrop advised on the design of tonal and mechanical components, while Fisk created the final design, voicing, and construction. The name "Flentrop-Andover" was picked because It was built when Fisk still was the president of the Andover company. Andrew Johnson, an organist at Mount Calvary Church, described the organ as being "clear" and "responsive". He wrote that the organ seems to "shapes the player". This organ includes two pedals that can be configured to activate specific stops to achieve a certain tonal quality. This bypasses having to pull the organ stops manually. The special pedals affect the lower register portion(Pedaal division) of the main keyboard(Great).

In 1964, Fisk built the first 3-manual modern mechanical organ in Tremont street, King's Chapel (op. 44), superseding a E.M. Skinner organ. Organist George Bozeman wrote in The Tracker that it provided a "vivid, rich sound, and a crystalline clarity that reveals the color and texture of each stop". Additionally, William Gatens wrote in American Record Guide that based on the recording, the organ sounded "thin and strident" and felt "dry" compared to Fisk's later works.

Fisk built two of the largest four-manual mechanical action instrument in 20th-century America. First one was built when he completed a four-manual and pedal instrument for the Memorial Church of Harvard in 1967, bringing his work back to his first alma mater(op. 46). This was a result of Fisk's attempted renovation of E. M. Skinner organ in Appleton Chapel, which was inadequate for the larger Memorial Church. Despite Fisk's efforts, the organ's sound was unbalanced and lacking in bass when played in the main church. To solve this problem, an entirely new organ was built. In 2010, it was later relocated to the Presbyterian church in Austin, Texas. Because the Presbyterian church had taller ceilings, full-length 32ft(~10m) stops was possible to be installed. Organist Christian Lane said that the control of the wind feels "amazing and voluptuous".

In 1970, Fisk installed a three-manual and pedal organ that was inspired by Silbermann's work at Old West Church, using casework from an early Thomas Appleton organ (op. 55). According to an interview in 1975, this lowered the cost of the organ by not having to build an entirely new casework.

The second of the largest four-manual mechanical action instrument in 20th century America was built in 1979, located at the city of St. Paul, Minnesota, Hope Presbyterian Church.

At the Downtown United Presbyterian Church, 121 N. Fitzhugh street, New York, a Fisk organ was built in 1981 and was installed in 1983. It weighed 9 tons, cost 300 000 USD, and had 2600 pipes. Like many of his organs, it uses manual trackers than electric ones (op. 83).

From 1980 to 1981, a historical baroque organ tuned in mean-tone temperament was recreated and installed in Houghton Chapel of Wellesley College (op. 72). It used reeds copied from historical organs and used historical organ wind systems. More specifically, the Rückpositiv and Brustwerk sections of the organ were recreated from the Friederich Stellwagen organ located in the Jakobikirche church in Lubeck. The four Brustpedal cantus firmus stops were copied from the Compenius organ located in Frederiksborg Castle in Copenhagen. Additionally, it was designed so the air supply can be supplied electrically or through manual pedals. This was the last organ Fisk have completed before succumbing to his longtime illness.

In 1981, another organ was planned to be built at Palmer Memorial Church, which is a de-facto church of Rice University. Though Fisk was chosen as the builder, he died before the construction so C.B. Fisk, Inc. continued to build the organ. The design commenced in 1989.

In 1984, a 4-manual organ was completed installing at Stanford's Memorial Church after Fisk died (op. 85). It was originally  commissioned in 1973 but was delayed for 25 years because of issues with finance and logistics. It is the largest organ in the Memorial Church and is named "Fisk-Nanney" organ, which is a reference to the church's organist, Herbert Nanney. It is designed to accommodate two different tuning systems meantone and equal temperament. There exists a large iron lever above the manuals that allows the organist to switch between the systems. Additionally, Manuel J. Rosales was consulted during the building process. In 1988, musicologist Mark Lindley published an analysis of the organ's tuning system. He found that the organ included tuning discrepancies, with various notes being few cents off from its historical counterparts. (See also: Stanford Memorial Church § Organs)

In 1992, a Fisk organ was installed in Meyerson Symphony Center, Dallas, Texas. It was originally conceived in 1982, where the plans to install an organ for concert hall were set out. With tonal design plan completed in 1983, this project was aided by architect I. M. Pei, acoustician Russell Johnson, and visual designer Charles Nazarian. Pei suggested that the brass highlights were added to make the organ fit better with its surroundings. The Resonance division of the organ, which operates at high pressure, was made easier to play using Fisk company's servopneumatic lever mechanism. The organ well-received by James Moeser, the former president of the American Guild of Organists, who described the organ as "one of the most important organs to have been built in this or any century".

Appearance in media 
Fisk has received media attention on various television shows and radio programs, such as NBC's Today Show, CBS's Sunday Morning with Charles Kuralt, and NPR's The Rest of the Story. He was featured in magazines like Technology Illustrated and Blair & Ketchum's Country Journal.

After his death, novels based on Fisk's life were published. One is titled The Organ Builder, written by Robert Cohen. It was inspired by Fisk's life and work as described in his obituary in The New York Times. Another was published a few decades later, which was when Stephen Kiernan wrote a novel named Universe of Two in 2020. The protagonist of the book is named Charlie Fish..

In addition to these literary works, a two-volume biography named Charles Brenton Fisk, Organ Builder was published two years after Fisk's death. This writing includes his writings and details about the organs he created.

In 2013, a 60-minute documentary named "Opus 139: To Hear the Music" by Denis Lanson was published. The documentary details how C. B. Fisk, Inc. employees builds organs and life of Charles Brenton Fisk.

Publications 
 The Organ's Breath of Life
 The Architect as Organ Maker
 Pipe Flueways
 Some Thoughts on Pipe Metal
 How Certain Musical Differences between the Historic Organs of Germany and France were Achieved by Differences in Construction

See also
 Glossary of music terminology
 List of pipe organ builders

References

Further reading

External links 
 List of all C.B. Fisk, Inc. organs
 Photos of Fisk

Organ builders
Manhattan Project people
Harvard College alumni
American physicists
American organists
1925 births
1983 deaths